Beuzeville-au-Plain is a former commune in the Manche department in the Normandy region in northwestern France. On 1 January 2016, it was merged into the commune of Sainte-Mère-Église.

World War II
After the liberation of the area by Allied Forces in early June 1944, engineers of the Ninth Air Force IX Engineering Command began construction of a combat Advanced Landing Ground to the south of the town.  Declared operational on 15 June, the airfield was designated as "A-6", it was initially used by the 371st Fighter Group which flew P-47 Thunderbolts until mid-September when the unit moved into Central France.  Along with the 371st, the 367th Fighter Group flew P-38 Lightnings from the airfield.  It was used until mid-September when it was closed.

Population

See also
Communes of the Manche department

References

Former communes of Manche